The Formation of Islam: Religion and Society in the Near East, 600-1800 is a book by American historian and orientalist, Jonathan Berkey, published by Cambridge University Press in 2003. The book is divided into four parts:
The Near East before Islam
The emergence of Islam: 600-750
The consolidation of Islam: 750-1000
Medieval Islam: 1000-1500

The book won the 2003 Albert Hourani Book Award from the Middle East Studies Association of North America.

References

History books about Islam
2003 non-fiction books
Cambridge University Press books